Sacramento City refers to any one of several things that represents the city of Sacramento:

Sacramento City College
Sacramento City Council
Sacramento City Hall
Sacramento City Library
Sacramento City Unified School District

See also
Sac City (disambiguation)